Gravitholus (meaning 'heavy dome') was a genus of pachycephalosaurid dinosaur from the late Cretaceous period (Campanian stage, around 75 million years ago). It was a pachycephalosaur, and like other pachycephalosaurids the skull roof formed a thick dome made of dense bone, which may have been used in head-butting contests over mates or territory. It lived in what is now Alberta, Canada, and was described in 1979 by W. P. Wall and Peter Galton. The type species is Gravitholus albertae. 

There is some debate amongst paleontologists as to whether the animal represents a distinct genus, or if it is synonymous with Stegoceras. Some recent publications indicate it may be a valid genus. Gravitholus was initially described as one of several pachycephalosaurids known from Dinosaur Park, including Stegoceras validum, Hanssuesia sternbergi, and Foraminacephale brevis. It is unclear whether all of these species would have lived in the area at the same time. A 2023 publication by Dyer et al. found Gravitholus and Hanssuesia to be synonymous with Stegoceras, thus decreasing the diversity of Dinosaur Park pachcephalosaurids to only two valid taxa. This conclusion was reached because of new morphological data recovered from synchrotron scanning of the skull revealed Gravitholus to be virtually identical to Stegoceras.

See also

 Timeline of pachycephalosaur research

References

Wall, W.P. & Galton, P.M. (1979). "Notes on pachycephalosaurid dinosaurs (Reptilia: Ornithischia) from North America, with comments on their status as ornithopods". Canadian Journal of Earth Sciences. 16:1176-1186
Maryanska, T., Chapman, R.E., and Weishampel, D.B. (2004). "Pachycephalosauria". In D. B. Weishampel, P. Dodson & H. Osmólska (eds.), The Dinosauria (second edition). University of California Press, Berkeley 464-477

External links
 Gravitholus at the Paleobiology Database
 Gravitholus on the Dinosaur Mailing List 

Late Cretaceous dinosaurs of North America
Fossil taxa described in 1979
Pachycephalosaurs
Taxa named by Peter Galton
Paleontology in Alberta
Campanian genus first appearances
Campanian genus extinctions
Ornithischian genera